The engine used in the Ford GT90 concept sports car is a 90-degree, quad-turbocharged, V12 engine; which itself is based on the Ford Modular V8 engine. It was Ford's first V12 since their Lincoln division's Lincoln-Zephyr V12 engine in 1948. 

A 6.0-liter V12 engine was used in the Ford Indigo concept, but that engine was based on the Ford Duratec V6 engine, which has no relation to the V12 used in the GT90, and is also less powerful.

Overview
It has a redline of 6,300 rpm. It is equipped with a forced induction system that uses four Garrett T2 turbochargers. The engine architecture was based on the 90-degree Ford Modular engine family, based on the same architecture and bore and stroke as the 4.6-litre V8 engine, but with four more cylinders added, two more in each cylinder bank. This yielded a 90-degree V12, with a  bore and a  stroke with the cylinders arranged in two banks in a single casting. 

The V12 engine, unique to the GT90, was developed by using a Lincoln Town Car as a test mule, in which they put the prototype engine in order to refine it.

Applications
Ford GT90

References

Engines by model
Ford engines
V12 engines